The Italian Radicals are a liberal political party in Italy, formed in 2001.

In politics, Italian Radicals may also refer to:
 Italian Radical Party, a far-left/left-liberal party (1877–1922)
 Radical Party, a left-liberal party splintered from the Italian Liberal Party (1955–1989)
 Transnational Radical Party, the transnational evolution of the Radical Party (1989–present)
 Antiprohibitionists on Drugs, electoral list (1989–1992)
 Pannella List, political association (1992–present) and electoral list (1992–1999)
 Bonino List, electoral successor of the Pannella List (1999–2004)
 Coscioni List, radical list that never ran in elections (2005)
 Rose in the Fist, electoral list (2006 general election)
 Bonino-Pannella List, electoral list (2009 European Parliament election)
 Amnesty Justice Freedom List, electoral list (2013 general election)

In architecture and design, Italian Radicals refers also to the Radical movement, 1965–1975

See also
 Radical Federative Movement, a Radical splinter party (1982–1985)
 Liberal Reformers, a Radical splinter party (2005–2009)